is a Japanese television comedy, following five young men who work at Lady Braganza, a butler café. It was adapted into a manga by Makoto Tateno.

Television series
The series aired Mondays between 13:15 and 14:45.

Cast
 Koji Seto as Segawa Kyoichi/Shiva
 Kenta Kamakari as Akasaka Junta/Renjou
 Keisuke Kato as Kitamura Kosuke/Ivory
 Gaku Shindo as Inada Gen/Silk
 Shugo Nagashima as Tsuruoka Kokoro/Ibu
 Eiji Sugawara as Fukawa Kiichi
 Shunji Fujimura as Shikawaichi Kura (Owner)
 Tetsushi Tanaka as Katano Sakatoru/Katapi

Guest stars

 Megumi Komatsu (ep1-2)
 Natsuhi Ueno (ep3-4)
 Hisae Morishita (ep5-6)
 Takahiro Uemura (ep5-6)
 Kaori Ikeda (ep7-8)
 Atsushi Hashimoto (ep7-8)
 Rie Minemura (ep9-10)
 Toshiyuki Toyonaga (ep9-10)
 Hana Kino (ep11-13)

Manga
The manga is licensed in English by Digital Manga Publishing, and in Germany by Egmont Manga.

Development

Makoto Tateno visited the cast and talked with them when she was developing the manga.

Reception

Snow Wildsmith described the manga as "enjoyable, but not all that memorable", but noted that the stereotypically "blatantly gay" chef could offend some readers.  Leroy Douresseaux felt the manga series had potential, but that the first volume was not "anything really special".  Connie C. described the manga as being "a cross between Antique Bakery and Princess Princess".  Matthew Warner felt it was fun to see the characters switch on their "butler-mode".

References

External links
 Official Site 

2007 Japanese television series debuts
2007 Japanese television series endings
Japanese drama television series
2007 manga
Shinshokan manga
Digital Manga Publishing titles